Matthias Verreth (born 20 February 1998) is a Belgian professional footballer who plays as a winger for Dutch club Willem II.

Career
Verreth made his professional debut as Jong PSV player in the second division on 26 February 2016 against Achilles '29. He played the full game. On 27 October 2018, Verreth made his debut in PSV's first team.

On 23 July 2019 he returned to Belgium, signing a 3-year contract with Waasland-Beveren. On 1 February 2021, Verreth joined Danish 1st Division club Kolding IF on loan for the rest of the season.

On 9 January 2022, Verreth signed with FC Eindhoven back in the Netherlands until the end of the season.

On 2 July 2022, he moved to Willem II on a two-year deal.

References

External links
 
 

1998 births
Living people
People from Herentals
Footballers from Antwerp Province
Belgian footballers
Association football wingers
PSV Eindhoven players
Jong PSV players
S.K. Beveren players
Kolding IF players
FC Eindhoven players
Willem II (football club) players
Eredivisie players
Eerste Divisie players
Belgian Pro League players
Belgium youth international footballers
Belgium under-21 international footballers
Belgian expatriate footballers
Expatriate footballers in the Netherlands
Expatriate men's footballers in Denmark
Belgian expatriate sportspeople in the Netherlands
Belgian expatriate sportspeople in Denmark